William Stanley Beveridge (July 1, 1909 - February 13, 1995) was a Canadian ice hockey goaltender who played nine seasons in the National Hockey League (NHL) for the Detroit Cougars, Ottawa Senators, St. Louis Eagles, Montreal Maroons and New York Rangers.

Playing career
The Ottawa Senators first signed Beveridge, but he broke in as an NHL rookie on loan to the Detroit Cougars in the 1929–30 NHL season. His season with Detroit was not successful and he was returned to the Senators shortly afterwards.

He first received playing time for the Senators during the 1930–31 season, playing eight games. The Senators were not a good team that year and his goals against average (GAA) was 3.69.

When Ottawa suspended operations for the 1931–32 season, Beveridge found himself in the minors with the Providence Reds, and led the Canadian–American Hockey League in wins that year.

Ottawa resumed play in the NHL for 1932–33 and Beveridge was back with the Senators as a backup to Alex Connell. After Connell injured his knee in a December game against Chicago, Beveridge had a chance to play regularly. He got three shutouts in his first eight games but following Connell's return, Beveridge only played if Connell struggled.

He played one more year for the Senators and stayed with the team when it relocated as the St. Louis Eagles. In April 1935 Beveridge was one of several former Eagles and Senators who took part in an exhibition game in Ottawa, in which players sported either Eagles of Senators uniforms as they played each other. When the Eagles folded after one season, the players were dispersed in a dispersal draft and he was picked up by the Montreal Canadiens for $4000. However, he never played for the Canadiens, being sold to the Montreal Maroons, again replacing Alex Connell following his retirement.

In 1935–36, the Maroons obtained Lorne Chabot from Chicago, and Beveridge could not get back in the line-up after Chabot took over goaltending duties. However, Chabot retired at 35 after the season, seemingly giving Beveridge another chance.

In 1936–37, Alex Connell returned to the Maroons, and Beveridge was his back-up yet again. Connell struggled and then Beveridge replaced Connell for a third time. This time Beveridge played well and the Maroons finished second in the Canadian Division, and defeated the Boston Bruins in opening round of the playoffs. Their opponent in the next series, the New York Rangers, were led by former Maroon goalie Dave Kerr who shut them out twice. This was the Maroons' final playoffs and Beveridge's only NHL playoff experience.

He played for minor league teams until the 1942–43 season when he received a call-up to the New York Rangers to replace the injured Jimmy Franks. He played in 17 games and recorded a shutout. After the season, he joined the Canadian Army.

After his service, he finished his playing days playing senior league hockey for the Ottawa Commandos (as the amateur Ottawa Senators were named during World War II) of the Quebec Senior Hockey League (QSHL).

After hockey
After retiring from hockey for good in 1945, Beveridge became a coach at Carleton University. He also became a city councillor.

As one of the last surviving Ottawa Senators, he was present at the opening game in 1992 for the new Ottawa Senators. He died on February 13, 1995. He is interred in Beechwood Cemetery in Ottawa.

Career statistics

Regular season and playoffs

References

External links
 

1909 births
1995 deaths
Buffalo Bisons (AHL) players
Canadian ice hockey goaltenders
Cleveland Barons (1937–1973) players
Detroit Cougars players
Ice hockey people from Ottawa
Montreal Maroons players
New Haven Eagles players
New York Rangers players
Ottawa Senators (1917) players
Ottawa Senators (original) players
Providence Reds players
St. Louis Eagles players
Syracuse Stars (AHL) players
Canadian expatriate ice hockey players in the United States